David Chung OBE (born Chung Kim Hiong: July 13, 1962 in Malaysia) is a Malaysian-Papua New Guinean sports official, and was the President of the Papua New Guinea Football Association (PNGFA) from 2004 until 2018. He was a member of the FIFA Council.

Biography 
Chung moved from Malaysia to Papua New Guinea in 1985, and became a naturalised citizen of his adoptive country. Though "initially involved" in rugby league, he subsequently became an association football player, coach and referee, and then a senior official. While "administering football" in the New Guinea Highlands, he "helped secure outside funding as well as contribute personal finance towards youth development programmes". He became president of the Papua New Guinea Football Association in 2004, and then the senior vice-president of the Oceania Football Confederation under OFC president Reynald Temarii of Tahiti in 2007. When Temarii was suspended by FIFA Ethics Committee on allegations of corruption in November 2010, Chung was elevated to the position of acting president, with New Zealand's Fred de Jong as his senior vice-president. In January 2011, he was elected to the presidency of the OFC unopposed, for a four-year term.

The OFC credits Chung with launching Papua New Guinea’s "first ever semi-professional football competition in 2006", the Papua New Guinea National Soccer League, as well as with boosting grassroots football, supporting women’s football and overseeing "a series of infrastructure projects including a national football academy in Lae and regional technical centre in Kimbe with plans in place to build an additional regional technical centre in Port Moresby beginning 2011".

Chung was named as a recipient of the Order of the British Empire in the Queen’s Birthday Honours list in July 2012.

On 6 April 2018, Chung stepped down from the role of OFC President, PNGFA President and the FIFA Council, citing personal reasons. In March 2019 he was fined 100,000 Swiss francs (£ 76,000) after being found guilty of corruption, and was banned "from all football-related activities" for six-and-a-half years.

References 

Living people
1962 births
Association football executives
Papua New Guinean footballers
Officers of the Order of the British Empire
Malaysian emigrants to Papua New Guinea
Papua New Guinean people of Chinese descent

Association footballers not categorized by position
Presidents of OFC